Chhatrapati Shivaji Maharaj (1630–1680 CE), was a Hindu warrior king and was the founder of the Maratha Empire in India. He has been considered a prominent historical figure in India. A number of films, books, plays and television serials have been produced about his life and about figures associated with him.

Books
 Shriman Yogi by Ranjit Desai
 Rajeshri by Nagnath S. Inamdar
  Shivaji and his times  by Jadunath Sarkar
 Shivaji , the grand rebel by Dennis Kincaid
 Sadashib series by Saradindu Bandopadhyay

Films

Television

Theatre
 Janata Raja
 Raygadala Jevha Jaag Yete

References

Celebrities in popular culture
Indian history in popular culture